The William C. Schmeisser Award is an award given annually to the NCAA's most outstanding defenseman in men's college lacrosse.  The award is presented by the USILA and is named after William C. "Father Bill" Schmeisser, a player and coach for Johns Hopkins University in the early 1900s.  Schmeisser played defense at Hopkins from 1900 to 1902. He was head coach of the Blue Jays from 1907 to 1911 and continued to serve as an advisory coach to the team thereafter, accompanying the team to the 1928 Olympics in Amsterdam.  He was a charter founder of the Mt. Washington Lacrosse Club and was inducted into the U.S. Lacrosse Hall of Fame in 1957.

Award Winners by Year

Number of Awards by University

See also
Jack Turnbull Award
Lt. Raymond Enners Award
McLaughlin Award
Major League Lacrosse Defensive Player of the Year Award
National Lacrosse League Defensive Player of the Year Award

References

External links
 US Lacrosse Awards page

College lacrosse trophies and awards in the United States